Lake Manawa is a lake located in Council Bluffs, Iowa, in the United States.  It was formed from a Missouri River flood in 1881.  It is the closest lake to Omaha, Nebraska and surrounding metro area which allows motor boating, water skiing, and wakeboarding. Lake Area:

References

External links
Official website

Manawa
Bodies of water of Pottawattamie County, Iowa